is a Japanese sprint canoer who competed in the mid-1960s. At the 1964 Summer Olympics, she was eliminated in the semifinals of the K-2 500 m event.

External links
Sports-reference.com profile

1943 births
Canoeists at the 1964 Summer Olympics
Japanese female canoeists
Living people
Olympic canoeists of Japan